Iselsberg-Stronach is a municipality in the district of Lienz in Austrian state of Tyrol.

Population

Climate
The Köppen Climate Classification subtype for this climate is Dfc/Dfb (continental subarctic climate), bordering extremely closely on a humid continental climate.

References

Cities and towns in Lienz District
Kreuzeck group
Schober Group